Rawsonia is a genus of flowering plants in the family Achariaceae.

Species
Plants of the World Online lists two species:
 Rawsonia burtt-davyi (Edlin) F.White
 Rawsonia lucida Harv. & Sond. (synonyms include: R. reticulata Gilg, R. spinidens (Hiern) Mendonca ex Sleumer)

References

External links

 
Malpighiales genera
Taxonomy articles created by Polbot
Taxa named by Otto Wilhelm Sonder